= Nico Lehto =

Finnish ice hockey player

- Born: 19 June 1990 (age 34); Oulu, Finland
- Height: 6 ft 0 in (183 cm)
- Weight: 203 lb (92 kg; 14 st 7 lb)
- Position: Defence
- Shot: Left
- Played for: Oulun Kärpät
- NHL draft: Undrafted
- Playing career: 2008–2018

Nico Lehto (born 19 June 1990) is a Finnish former professional ice hockey defenceman who played for Oulun Kärpät in the SM-liiga.
